Orlando George Charles Bridgeman, 3rd Earl of Bradford, PC, DL (24 April 1819 – 12 March 1898), styled Viscount Newport between 1825 and 1865, was a British courtier and Conservative politician. In a ministerial career spanning over thirty years, he notably served as Lord Chamberlain of the Household between 1866 and 1868 and as Master of the Horse between 1874 and 1880 and again between 1885 and 1886.

Background and education
Bridgeman was born at Nottingham Place, Marylebone, London, the eldest son of George Bridgeman, 2nd Earl of Bradford, and his wife Georgina Elizabeth Moncreiffe, daughter of Sir Thomas Moncreiffe, 5th Baronet. He was educated at Harrow and Trinity College, Cambridge. He became known by the courtesy title Viscount Newport when his father succeeded in the earldom of Bradford in 1825.

Political career
Lord Newport was elected Member of Parliament for Shropshire South in 1842. In February 1852, he was appointed Vice-Chamberlain of the Household in Lord Derby's first administration, a post he held until the fall of the government in December of the same year, and again from 1858 to 1859 in Derby's second administration. He was admitted to the Privy Council in 1852. In 1865, he succeeded his father in the earldom and entered the House of Lords. When Derby became prime minister for the third time in 1866, Lord Bradford was made Lord Chamberlain of the Household, an office he retained until December 1868, the last year under the premiership of Benjamin Disraeli. He again served under Disraeli as Master of the Horse between 1874 and 1880 and held the same office from 1885 to 1886 in Lord Salisbury's first administration.

Apart from his political career, Lord Bradford was a Deputy Lieutenant of Staffordshire and served as Lord-Lieutenant of Shropshire between 1875 and 1896. He served in the North Shropshire Yeomanry Cavalry, beginning as cornet in 1839, promoted captain in 1844, and resigning in 1869. He was also an Honorary Colonel in the 1st Volunteer Battalion of the Shropshire Light Infantry.

Sport interests
Lord Bradford was a Thoroughbred racehorse owner, with colours of white, scarlet sleeves, and a black cap borne by his jockeys. He won the Cesarewitch at Newmarket in 1865 with Salpinctes and, in 1879, with Chippendale who came second in two successive races for the same cup.  He ultimately won the 1892 Derby with Sir Hugo.

Invited by William Penny Brookes, he was President of the Wenlock Olympian Society in 1874, when Much Wenlock hosted the National Olympian Games.

Family

Lord Bradford married the Honourable Selina Weld-Forester, daughter of Cecil Weld-Forester, 1st Baron Forester, on 20 April 1844. They had four children:

Lady Mabel Selina Bridgeman (d. 1933), married Colonel William Kenyon-Slaney on 22 February 1887.
Lady Florence Katharine Bridgeman (1859–1943), married the 5th Earl of Harewood on 5 November 1881.
George Cecil Orlando Bridgeman, 4th Earl of Bradford (1845–1915).
Brigadier Hon. Francis Charles Bridgeman (1846–1917).

The Countess was noted for "intelligence, gaiety and sympathy". Benjamin Disraeli was deeply attached to both Lady Bradford and her sister Anne, Countess of Chesterfield. After his wife's death in 1872, his feelings seem to have become even warmer and it has been suggested that he would have proposed marriage had Lady Bradford been free to marry.

The Countess of Bradford died in November 1894. Lord Bradford died after a long illness at Weston Park, Staffordshire, in March 1898, aged 78. He was buried on 12 March 1898 at Weston-under-Lizard. His eldest son George succeeded in the earldom.

References

External links 
 

1819 births
1898 deaths
Alumni of Trinity College, Cambridge
3
Lord-Lieutenants of Shropshire
Shropshire Yeomanry officers
Members of the Privy Council of the United Kingdom
Newport, Orlando Bridgeman, Viscount
Newport, Orlando Bridgeman, Viscount
Newport, Orlando Bridgeman, Viscount
Newport, Orlando Bridgeman, Viscount
Newport, Orlando Bridgeman, Viscount
Newport, Orlando Bridgeman, Viscount
Bradford, E3
British racehorse owners and breeders
Owners of Epsom Derby winners
Orlando
People educated at Harrow School